Doclin is a commune in Caraș-Severin County, western Romania with a population of 2.047 people. It is composed of three villages: Biniș (Bényes), Doclin and Tirol (Királykegye).

References

Communes in Caraș-Severin County
Localities in Romanian Banat